The flannel moths or crinkled flannel moths (scientific name Megalopygidae) are a family of insects. They occur in North America (11 species) and the New World tropics.

Distribution and habitat
The moth occurs in North America and the New World tropics.

Life cycle and behavior
Adult flannel moths are stout-bodied, and very hairy. Females have thin antennae while males' are feather-like. Larvae are called puss caterpillars and, with their long hairs, resemble cotton balls. They have venomous spines that can cause a painful sting and inflammation lasting for several days. In some cases, the sting may cause headache, nausea, and shock-like symptoms. Perhaps the most notorious for stinging is the caterpillar of Megalopyge opercularis. Caterpillars have 7 pairs of prolegs, while other Lepidopterae have 5 or fewer pairs. They feed on a wide variety of deciduous trees and shrubs.

Genera

Aithorape
Cephalocladia
Coamorpha
Edebessa
Endobrachys
Eochroma
Hysterocladia
Macara
Malmella
Megalopyge
Mesoscia
Microcladia
Microrape
Norape
Norapella
Podalia
Proterocladia
Psychagrapha
Repnoa
Thoscora
Trosia
Vescoa
Zyzypyge

References

Sources
 Natural History Museum genus database
 
 BugGuide
 USGS--Caterpillars of Eastern Forests
 Auburn University 
 Moths of Borneo—lists the family as neotropical
 Virginia Tech Cooperative Extension
 Ohio State University

External links